Manik Govind Bhide (born 1935) is a Hindustani classical music vocalist from Kolhapur and based in Mumbai. She is known for being Kishori Amonkar's student and Ashwini Bhide-Deshpande's guru and mother. She is an exponent of the Jaipur-Atrauli gharana.

Early life and training
Born Manik Potnis in Kolhapur, she was encouraged by her parents to learn music. She began her early classical training with Madhukar Sadolikar of the Jaipur-Atrauli gharana.

Later, she married scientist Govind Bhide. Following, around 1964, the couple relocated to Mumbai. A family friend, Vamanrao Deshpande, brought the young couple to meet Mogubai Kurdikar, his guru. Though Kurdikar wasn't present, Manik Bhide met Kishori Amonkar and soon became her student after the former heard the latter sing. She continued to learn from Amonkar for 15 years. Bhide learned alongside Suhasini Mulgaonkar, Arun Dravid, Meera Panshikar, and others.

Training with Kishori Amonkar
Though a devout follower and admirer of Amonkar, Bhide's relationship with her guru was challenging and demanding. Under tremendous stress and Amonkar's infamous temperamentality. Bhide had accompanied Amonkar in every concert for over a decade. After a falling out, Bhide discontinued learning from Amonkar in 1981. Following, she dedicated her musical life to teaching. After several decades, Bhide and Amonkar reconciled.

Career
Bhide has performed at most major music conferences in India and was a regular performer for All India Radio.

Students
At the urging of Mogubai Kurdikar, Bhide began teaching her daughter, Ashwini, the Jaipur-Atrauli gayaki. She has also taught Geetika Varde and many others.

Discography
 The Sanctity of Parampara (1987; Rhythm House) – Raag Nayaki Kanada, Raag Bihag. Featuring Baban Manjrekar (harmonium), Omkar Gulvady (tabla), Vandana Shirodkar (tanpura). Recorded by Avinash Oak.

Accolades
 2018 – Bharat Ratna Pt. Bhimsen Joshi Jeevan Gaurav Puraskar, presented by Arvind Parikh

References

External links

 The Jaipur gharana (includes sound samples)

1935 births
Living people
Hindustani singers
Singers from Mumbai
Indian women classical singers
20th-century Indian singers
Women Hindustani musicians
20th-century Indian women singers
21st-century Indian women singers
21st-century Indian singers
Women musicians from Maharashtra